The Agency for Legalisation, Urbanisation and Integration of Informal Areas and Buildings (ALUIZNI) is the government agency responsible for coordinating the legalization process in Albania. It has the authority to interpret and confirm decisions on legalisation permits and to coordinate inter-institutional action related to all informal construction activity present in the country.

See also
State Cadastre Agency

References

 
 
Housing agencies of Albania